Pando is a department in Northern Bolivia, with an area of , in the Amazon Rainforest, adjoining the border with Brazil and Perú. Pando has a population of 154,355 (2020 census). Its capital is the city of Cobija.

The department, named after former president José Manuel Pando (1899–1905), is divided into five provinces.

Although Pando is rich in natural resources, the poverty level of its inhabitants is high, due largely to the lack of roads effectively linking the province to the rest of the country. In addition, residents suffer from debilitating effects of tropical diseases, typical of life in the Amazonian rain forest. The main economic activities are agriculture, timber and cattle.

At an altitude of 280 metres above sea level in the northwestern jungle region, Pando is located in the rainiest part of Bolivia. Pando has a hot climate, with temperatures commonly above 26 degrees Celsius (80 Fahrenheit).

Pando is the least populous department in Bolivia, the most tropical (lying closest to the Equator in the Amazonian Basin), and the most isolated, due to an absence of effective roads. It was organized at the beginning of the 20th century from what was left of the Acre Territory, lost to Brazil as a result of the so-called Acre War (1903). Its capital city of Cobija (the smallest of all the Bolivian departmental capitals) was named after the much-lamented Bolivian port of the same name on the Pacific Ocean, part of an area lost to Chile following the War of the Pacific.

Although remote, Pando is densely forested and close to navigable waterways leading to the Amazon River and from there on to the Atlantic Ocean. The department had a rubber boom in the late 19th century and early 20th century, along with the northern part of the nearby Beni department. The local industry collapsed under competition with rubber cultivated in Southeast Asia, as well as the discovery and manufacture of synthetic rubber.

Culturally, the Pandinos are considered part of the so-called Camba culture of the Bolivian lowlands, similar to the people of the country's other two tropical departments, Beni and Santa Cruz. Many of Pando's original settlers moved from nearby Beni.

Autonomy movement
Far from the centers of power in Bolivian society, Pando has recently linked its fate with that of Santa Cruz and Beni, which (along with Tarija and Chuquisaca) are demanding increased autonomy for the departments, with a lessening in central government power. Prefect Leopoldo Fernández strongly backed autonomy for the department, in alliance with other governors of the eastern media luna (half-moon, so known for their combined geographic shape). Nationwide referendums on autonomy held on July 2, 2006, were approved in all four departments. A second referendum to approve a statute of autonomy was held by each department in mid-2008, despite being declared illegal by the National Electoral Court in March. Left-wing and pro-Morales social movements boycotted the votes.

Pando's referendum, held on June 1, 2008, won 82% approval among those who voted. But 46.5% of the registered electorate did not vote, the highest abstention rate in the four departments holding such referendums. Considerable social unrest took place in 2008, culminating with the arrest in September 2008 of Prefect Leopoldo Fernández, stemming from the massacre at El Porvenir of anti-autonomy backers of President Evo Morales.

Provinces of Pando 
 Abuná
 Federico Román
 Madre de Dios
 Manuripi
 Nicolás Suárez

Demographics

Languages 
The predominant language in the department is Spanish. The following table shows the number of those belonging to the recognized group of speakers.

Places of interest 
 Manuripi-Heath Amazonian Wildlife National Reserve
 International Recreational Fishing Championship of Puerto Rico, Pando, Bolivia
 El Chivé
 Porvenir (Pando)

Gallery

References

External links 
 Pando Travel Guide
 Weather in Pando
 Pando Official website
 "Bolivia 9/11: Bodies and Power on a Feudal Frontier" by Bret Gustafson, Upside Down World, 14 July 2009
 Full information of Pando Department, Bolivian Land
 Bolivian Amazon

 
Departments of Bolivia
States and territories established in 1938